Mere Desh Ki Dharti is a 2022 Indian Hindi-language agriculture based drama film directed by Faraz Haider and produced by Vaishali Sarwankar under the banner of Carnival Motion Pictures, part of entertainment conglomerate Carnival Group. The film has an ensemble cast of Divyenndu Sharma, Anant Vidhaat, Anupriya Goenka and Inaamulhaq. The film rotates around two engineers and their transforming journey in life. The film also portrays the harsh realities of farmers in the villages of India. 

The concept of Mere Desh Ki Dharti was devised by Dr. Shrikant Bhasi, and the story and screenplay were then written by Neel Chakraborty and Faraz Haider respectively while Piyush Mishra has written the dialogues. The film was scheduled to be released theatrically on 14 August 2020, but was postponed due to the COVID-19 pandemic. Other casts include Brijendra Kala, Rajesh Sharma, Atul Shrivastava, and Farrukh Jaffar. The film premiered at the 2022 Jaipur International Film Festival, where it won 2nd Best Film. It was theatrically released on 6 May 2022.

Plot 
 
Young engineer Ajay, goes to rural India with his friend Sameer  after facing setbacks in his career. Almost at the verge of committing suicide the two end up going to a village where they see the struggle of farmers and feel they should work in the farming sector and against a lot of challenges especially against rate fixing agents and intermediate buyers the two go on to revolutionise the farming sector in the region by using all the available technics and facilities availed by the government and lot of self innovation.

Cast 
 Divyenndu Sharma as Ajay
 Anant Vidhaat as Ajay's friend, Sameer
 Anupriya Goenka as Jhumki
 Inaamulhaq as Pappan Khan
 Brijendra Kala as Dubey Ji
 Rajesh Sharma as Kishanlal
 Avantika Khattri as Priyanka Khurrana
 Atul Shrivastava as Ajay's father
 Farrukh Jaffar as Daadi
 Rutuja Shinde as Shilpa
 Dilip Tahil as Shilpa's father
 Manu Rishi Chadha as Billu
 Imran Rasheed as Ramdas
 Kamlesh Sawant as Bhau
 Scarlett Wilson as Special appearance
 Neel Chakraborty as Gautam

Production

Filming 
Mere Desh Ki Dharti was formally launched in 2020. Principal photography of the film began in January 2020 in Bhopal, Madhya Pardesh. Filming was wrapped up in March 2020. Most of the scenes were shot in the Sehore district of Bhopal in January followed by Mumbai, Maharashtra in February and March.

Soundtrack 
The music of the film is composed by Vikram Montrose and the title song has been sung by Sukhwinder Singh.

Release 
Earlier, the film was slated to release on 14 August 2020, but was postpond due to the COVID-19. Now the movie is releasing in theaters on 6 May 2022.

References

External links 

 

2022 films
2022 drama films
Hindi-language drama films
Films not released in theaters due to the COVID-19 pandemic
Films about farmers